Conor Joseph Mullee (born February 25, 1988) is an American former professional baseball pitcher. He has previously played in Major League Baseball (MLB) for the New York Yankees.

Career

New York Yankees
Mullee played college baseball at Saint Peter's College, primarily as an infielder but he was drafted by the New York Yankees in the 24th round of the 2010 Major League Baseball Draft as a Right handed pitcher.

Unfortunately Mullee was forced to undergo Tommy John Surgery in June 2011 after experiencing elbow pain, he pitched five innings for the Staten Island Yankees before requiring surgery after suffering an avulsion fracture in which his repaired Ligament tore off the bone. This time a screw had to be used to hold the Ligament in place. Mullee was forced to undergo surgery a third time in February, 2013 after his bone failed to properly heal around the screw. Having thrown only five innings from 2011-13 due to the elbow issues, he returned in 2014 and pitched well for the Staten Island Yankees and the Charleston RiverDogs and moved up the minor league ladder to the Yankees AAA affiliate the Scranton/Wilkes-Barre RailRiders, in 2015.

Mullee was called up to the majors for the first time on May 14, 2016. Mullee pitched in three games, giving up one run in three innings pitched before he was placed on the 15-day DL with nerve issue in his hand on July 3. The Yankees announced he would miss the rest of the season and subsequently put him on the 60 day disabled list on August 13.

Chicago Cubs
Mullee was claimed off waivers by the Chicago Cubs on November 2, 2016, and on December 12, 2016, signed to a one-year minor-league contract with an invitation to major-league Spring Training. He was released on July 5, 2017.

References

External links

1988 births
Living people
Baseball players from Virginia
Major League Baseball pitchers
Saint Peter's Peacocks baseball players
Gulf Coast Yankees players
Staten Island Yankees players
Charleston RiverDogs players
Tampa Yankees players
Trenton Thunder players
Scranton/Wilkes-Barre RailRiders players
New York Yankees players
People from Ashburn, Virginia